Keshar-e Olya (also Romanized as Keshār-e ‘Olyā; also known as Keshār-e Bālā) is a village in Sulqan Rural District, Kan District, Tehran County, Tehran Province, Iran. At the 2006 census, its population was 541, in 127 families.

References 

Populated places in Tehran County